"We Are The Normal" is a song by the Goo Goo Dolls. It was the first and only single from their fourth album Superstar Car Wash, which allowed them to collaborate with one of their primary influences, Paul Westerberg of The Replacements. The song was a minor success for the Goo Goo Dolls, managing to hit number 5 on the US Modern Rock chart.

Like many of the early Goo Goo Dolls singles, "We Are the Normal" was released in a promotional format only.

Track listing
"We Are The Normal" - 3:38

Writing and composition
Westerberg co-wrote the track, which is notable for its dynamic range: soft instrumental passages in which a mournful yet melodic viola is interwoven with acoustic guitars; driving, electrified verses in which John Rzeznik's vocals are delivered with a twisted blend of urgency and apathy; and a soaring, anthemic chorus. Rzeznik wrote the music and sent it to Westerberg on a cassette, and Westerberg wrote the lyrics based on the music.

Charts

References

1993 singles
Goo Goo Dolls songs
Songs written by John Rzeznik
Songs written by Robby Takac
Songs written by Paul Westerberg
Songs written by George Tutuska
1992 songs
Warner Records singles
American power pop songs